The legacy of a family's passion for Victorian art and design, Wightwick Manor (pronounced "Wittick") is a Victorian manor house located on Wightwick Bank, Wolverhampton, West Midlands, England. Owned by the National Trust since 1937, the Manor and its grounds are open to the public. It is one of only a few surviving examples of a house built and furnished under the influence of the Aesthetic movement and Arts and Crafts movement.  The house is in a grand version of the half-timbered vernacular style, of which the most famous original example is Little Moreton Hall over 40 miles to the north, in Cheshire (also National Trust).

The house is a notable example of the influence of William Morris, with original Morris wallpapers and fabrics, De Morgan tiles, Kempe glass and Pre-Raphaelite works of art, including works by Dante Gabriel Rossetti, Evelyn De Morgan, Edward Burne-Jones, Ford Madox Brown, John Everett Millais, Elizabeth Siddal and Leonard Shuffrey.

History

Wightwick was built by Theodore Mander, of the Mander family, who were successful 19th-century industrialists in the area (Mander Brothers), and his wife Flora, daughter of Henry Nicholas Paint, member of Parliament in Canada. It was designed by Edward Ould of Liverpool in two phases; the first was completed in 1887 and the house was extended with the Great Parlour wing in 1893. The elaborate pendant imitation Jacobean plaster ceiling was designed by Leonard Shuffrey. Notes taken by Theodore Mander at a lecture given in Wolverhampton in 1884 by Oscar Wilde on the 'House Beautiful' inspired Wightwick's interiors.  Taking inspiration from this lecture, Theodore and his wife Flora decorated its interiors with the designs of William Morris and his Arts and Crafts contemporaries.  However, the Pre-Raphaelite collection was mostly assembled after the house was donated to the National Trust, particularly by Geoffrey Mander and his second wife, Rosalie, who was an art historian.

In 1937 Geoffrey Mander, a radical Liberal MP and local paint manufacturer who had been left the timber-framed house by his father Theodore, persuaded the National Trust to accept a house that was just 50 years old, under the Country Houses Scheme Act. 

This house of the Aesthetic Movement was, by 1937, a relic of an out of fashion era. Yet, so complete was the design that it was worthy of preservation. Having given the house to the Trust, Geoffrey Mander and his second wife, Rosalie, became its live-in curators, opening the house to the public and adding to its contents. In particular they added a notable collection of Pre-Raphaelite paintings by Rossetti, Burne-Jones and their followers.  Descendants of the family retain a private apartment in the manor.

House, art collection and gardens
The Manor has the work of 13 professional female artists on permanent public display, more than any other in the National Trust, including notable examples of works by Lizzie Siddal, Lucy Madox Brown, Marie Spartali Stillman, and May Morris. Most of these artworks were collected by the Manders.  The malthouse gallery now houses a group of works by Evelyn De Morgan and her husband William, on loan from the De Morgan Foundation.

The house has 17 acres of woodland and gardens and the outbuildings include parts of an earlier Jacobean manor house, stables (now a tea room); a gallery in the old malt house; gift shop; and a second-hand bookshop. 

It is situated just off the main A454 Wolverhampton to Bridgnorth road, approximately three miles to the west of the city centre.

The manor has been Grade I listed on the National Heritage List for England since July 1950, and its gardens are Grade II listed on the Register of Historic Parks and Gardens.

See also
List of works by Grayson and Ould
Treasure Houses of Britain

References

External links

Wightwick Manor information at the National Trust
Wightwick Manor entry from The DiCamillo Companion to British & Irish Country Houses
Wightwick Manor Garden — a Gardens Guide review
"Sir Geoffrey Mander: the last of the Midland Radicals" by Nicholas Mander
"Wightwick Manor: the House Beautiful"
Photos of Wightwick Manor and surrounding area on geograph.org.uk
National Trust Collections

Arts and Crafts architecture in England
Buildings by Grayson and Ould
Conservation areas in England
Country houses in the West Midlands (county)
Grade II listed parks and gardens in the West Midlands (county)
Grade I listed houses
Grade I listed buildings in the West Midlands (county)
Historic house museums in the West Midlands (county)
Houses completed in 1887
Manor houses in England
Museums in Wolverhampton
National Trust properties in the West Midlands (county)
Tudor Revival architecture in England